Rap star or Rapstar may refer to:

Rap Star (TV series), a 2020 Chinese series
Rapstar, a 2021 song by Polo G
Rapstar (group), an Italian hip hop duo
Rapstar, a 2004 album by Ceza

See also
Rapping